Wallace Dann (January 12, 1847– 1934) was a two-term Democratic mayor of Norwalk, Connecticut from 1905 to 1907. He was also a member of the Connecticut House of Representatives from 1903 to 1905.

Early life and family 
He was born in Stamford, Connecticut on January 12, 1847. He was the son of William Edgar Dann, and Pauline Curtis Dann. He attended Professor Wicoff's Academy in New Canaan. He married Clarissa J. Dikeman on September 1, 1869. He was in the livery and grocery business in New Canaan.

Political career 
He was sheriff from 1875 to 1881 and from 1884 to 1887. He was police chief from 1892 to 1899. He was president of the Norwalk Brass Company beginning in 1901. On January 5, 1903, he was elected Water Commissioner.

From 1903 to 1904, he served in the Connecticut House of Representatives. He was a member of the School Fund Committee, and the Contested Elections Committee. He was a leader on the issue of whether South Norwalk and Norwalk would be separate or consolidated.

He ran for mayor of Norwalk, and served from 1905 to 1907. In 1906, he defeated Republican challenger Goold Hoyt for re-election.

In 1926, he was appointed by mayor Jeremiah Donovan to the Norwalk Board of Relief for a three-year term.

Associations 
Member, Harmony Lodge of Masons, New Canaan
High Priest (1884), Washington Chapter 24 Reformed and Accepted Masons.
Member, Eminent Commander (1882), Clinton Commandery Number 3 Knights Templar
Member, Pyramid Temple of Bridgeport
Member, Odd Fellows
Member, Mecca Temple, Nobles of the Mystic Shrine 
Vestryman, St. Paul's Episcopal Church
Member, Sons of the American Revolution
Member, Norwalk Club
Member, Norwalk Board of Trade

References 

1847 births
1934 deaths
Chiefs of police
Connecticut sheriffs
American Episcopalians
Mayors of Norwalk, Connecticut
Democratic Party members of the Connecticut House of Representatives
Politicians from Stamford, Connecticut